Gregory Sedoc (born 16 October 1981 in Amsterdam, North Holland) is a Dutch hurdler.

Career
He reached his first international final at the 2007 European Indoor Championships in 60 metres hurdles, and won the event, equalling his personal best time of 7.63 seconds which was established in the previous rounds and beating fellow-countryman Marcel van der Westen by 0.01 second. Commenting on the win, Sedoc stated that "this is so ridiculous. Unbelievable. I never thought I would be able to become European champion... Getting a one-two in the final has never happened to the Netherlands before and it's fantastic." Sedoc followed this up with a silver medal at the 2009 European Indoor Championships.

He had previously competed at the European Championships in 2002 and 2006, the World Championships in 2003 and 2005 and the 2004 Olympics, as well as numerous European Indoor (2002, 2005) and World Indoor Championships (2003, 2004, 2006), without ever reaching the final.

Since 2007, he has competed at the 2008 and 2012 Summer Olympics, reaching the semifinals both times, as well as the 2009 and 2011 World Championships, and the 2012 and 2014 European Championships, reaching the final in 2012.

His personal best time over 110 m hurdles is 13.37 seconds, achieved in May 2007 in Hengelo.

Personal life
Sedoc grew up in a family of athletes. His father Roy Sedoc is a Dutch former athlete who became multiple Dutch champion in the long jump and triple jump disciplines. His brothers Jermaine, Randy are also athletes, and another brother, Valery Sedoc, is a former professional footballer for FC Groningen.

Dutch Championships 

Event

Indoor

References

External links

1981 births
Living people
Dutch male hurdlers
Olympic athletes of the Netherlands
Athletes (track and field) at the 2004 Summer Olympics
Athletes (track and field) at the 2008 Summer Olympics
Athletes (track and field) at the 2012 Summer Olympics
Dutch sportspeople of Surinamese descent
Athletes from Amsterdam